The 2001 Clemson Tigers football team represented Clemson University in NCAA Division I-A college football during the 2001 season. Clemson competed as a member of the Atlantic Coast Conference (ACC).

The team was led by head coach Tommy Bowden. Brad Scott served as the offensive coordinator, and Reggie Herring served as the defensive coordinator.

The Tigers finished the season 7–5, 4–4 in ACC play and won the Humanitarian Bowl 49–24 against Louisiana Tech.

Schedule

Roster

References

Clemson
Clemson Tigers football seasons
Famous Idaho Potato Bowl champion seasons
Clemson Tigers football